Tuurala is a village in Isokyrö, Finland. In 1997, it was nominated as "village of the year" in Southern Ostrobothnia. The village association has purchased a former school house, which is now used to organize educational events and as an information point with 12 computer work stations.

External links
Official website of the village association

Villages in Finland